Tanaecia lepidea, the grey count, is a species of nymphalid butterfly found in South and Southeast Asia.

Description

Upperside dark brown, paler in the female, with very obscure black markings of transverse lines across the cells of both forewings and hindwings and an oblique discal fascia on the forewing; an ash-grey continuous band along the termen of both forewings and hindwings, gradually broadening from the apex of the forewing, where it is very narrow, to the tornus of the hindwing, where it covers about one-third of the wing. In the female this band is outwardly narrowly bordered with brown. Cilia white. Antennae, head, thorax and abdomen dark brown above; beneath, the antennae ochraceous, the rest dusky white washed with ochraceous. Underside: Male ochraceous brown, female bright ochraceous. In both sexes the colours paler on the hindwing; the forewing somewhat narrowly, the hindwing much more broadly suffused with lilacine-grey on the terminal margins and along the dorsal margin of the hindwing; cells of both wings with dark brown sinuous transverse lines and looplike markings; both forewings and hindwings crossed by somewhat diffuse broad discal and narrower postdiscal dark bands, prominent on the forewing, obscure on the hindwing. Male with a patch of specialized dark scales above vein 4 on the upperside of the hindwing.

Distribution
Found in the lower Himalayas eastwards from Almora. In the Western Ghats, central India, Orissa, Bengal and into Assam and the Malay Peninsula. Found in forested habitats.

Life history

Larva. "Of the usual Euthalia form; colour green with a dorsal row of light red ocelli with blue centres; spines tipped with yellow." (Davidson & Aitken.)

Pupa. "More narrowed at the head than E. garuda, green, all the points golden tipped with black, and a few large spots of gold between." (Davidson & Aitken)

Food plants include Melastoma malabathricum and Planchonia careya.

References

Tanaecia
Butterflies described in 1868
Butterflies of Asia
Taxa named by Arthur Gardiner Butler